John Park Davies (1879 - 1937) was a Welsh Unitarian minister. He grew up in the Llandysul area, and attended the local Board School and County School, before gaining a place at the University College of Wales, Aberystwyth, from where he graduated in 1902, with a B.A. (Hons.) in Semitic Languages. In 1902 he began studies at Manchester College, Oxford, and in 1904 was awarded the Russell Martineau Hebrew prize, followed by the (university) Hall-Houghton Syriac prize in 1905. He subsequently commenced studies at Harvard University, from where he graduated in 1907. In 1908 he took up the position of Unitarian minister of Pontypridd, relocating in 1913 to take charge of the Old Presbyterian Chapel, Nantwich, and to Gateacre Chapel, Liverpool, in 1924.

In 1926 he was appointed Principal of the Presbyterian College, Carmarthen, and minister of Parc-y-Felfed Chapel.

He died in May 1937, and was buried at Capel Pant-y-Defaid, Ceredigion.

References 

1879 births
1937 deaths
20th-century Welsh clergy
Harvard University alumni